Medvedemolpus is a genus of leaf beetles in the subfamily Eumolpinae, known from the Philippines. It is named after the Chrysomelidae specialist Dr. Lev N. Medvedev, who had turned 75 at the time the genus was first described; the name is a combination of parts of both his surname and the name Eumolpus, indicating the subfamily placement of the genus.

Species
 Medvedemolpus bakeri Moseyko, 2010
 Medvedemolpus basilianus Moseyko, 2010
 Medvedemolpus quadripunctatus Moseyko, 2010
 Medvedemolpus quinquepunctatus Moseyko, 2010

References

Eumolpinae
Chrysomelidae genera
Beetles of Asia
Insects of the Philippines